The military ranks of Botswana are those of the Botswana Defence Force.  As a landlocked country, Botswana has no navy.

Commissioned officer ranks
The rank insignia of commissioned officers.

Other ranks
The rank insignia of non-commissioned officers and enlisted personnel.

References

External links
 

Botswana and the Commonwealth of Nations
Botswana
Ranks